Peadar is a masculine given name in the Irish, and Scottish Gaelic languages  (in Manx Gaelic orthography the same name is rendered "Peddyr"). The names are ultimately derived from the Greek word petros, meaning "stone", "rock". The Scottish Gaelic Peadar is said to be reserved for the saint, and the Scottish Gaelic Pàdraig. It is a variation of the name Peter.

List of people with the given name
Peadar Ó Doirnín (c. 1700 – 1769) Ulster poet, part of the Airgíalla tradition of poetry and song
Peadar Andrews, Irish Gaelic footballer who played for Dublin
Peadar Byrne, Irish Gaelic footballer who plays for Meath
Peadar Carton, Hurling player for Dublin and O'Tooles
Peadar Clancy (1888–1920), member of the Irish Republican Army (IRA) who served in the Four Courts garrison during the 1916 Easter Rising
Peadar Clohessy (born 1934), retired Irish Progressive Democrat politician
Peadar Cowan (1903–1962), Irish politician
Peadar Doyle (died 1956), Irish politician
Peadar Duignan (1898–1955), Irish Fianna Fáil politician
Peadar Gaskins, former Irish football player who played as a full back
Peadar Kearney (1883–1942), Irish republican and composer of numerous rebel songs
Peadar Kirby, author and academic at the Department of Politics and Public Administration at the University of Limerick
Peadar Livingstone (1930–1989), Roman Catholic Priest for the Diocese of Clogher in Ireland
Peadar Mac Fhionnlaoich (1857–1942), born in County Donegal, Ireland
Peadar Maher (1924–2012), Irish Fianna Fáil politician and publican
Peadar Ó Guilín, Irish author
Peadar O'Donnell (1893–1986), Irish republican Marxist activist and writer
Peadar O'Loughlin, Irish flute, fiddle, and uilleann pipes player from Kilmaley County Clare
Peadar Tóibín (born 1974), Sinn Féin TD
Peadar Uí Gealacáin (1793–1860), Irish scribe and hedge school master
Peadar Ua Laoghaire (1839–1920), Irish writer and Catholic priest

References

Irish-language masculine given names
Scottish Gaelic masculine given names
Scottish masculine given names